Sheoran is an Indian surname. Notable people with the surname include:

Anita Sheoran (born 1984), Indian wrestler
Lakshay Sheoran (born 1998), Indian sport shooter
Nirmala Sheoran (born 1995), Indian sprinter
Shilpi Sheoran (born 1989), Indian wrestler 
Sukhvinder Sheoran (born 1985), Indian politician
Insp. Satbir Singh Sheoran (BSF) Village Singhani, District Bhiwani awarded medals for OP Vijay and Prakaram. Awarded DG commendation card for distinguish services.

References